A la mala (Spanish for: By foul means) is a 2015 Mexican romantic comedy film directed by Pedro Pablo Ibarra and starring Aislinn Derbez and Mauricio Ochmann. It was written by Issa López and Ari Rosen. The film received mixed reviews.

Cast
Aislinn Derbez as Maria Laura "Mala" Medina
Mauricio Ochmann as Santiago
Catherine Papile as Kika
Luis Arrieta as Pablo
Daniela Schmidt as Patricia
Juan Diego Covarrubias as Alvaro
José Ron as Jerónimo
Iván Sánchez as Rafa
Ignacio Casano as boyfriend of Dani
Mane de la Parra as barman
Altair Jarabo as Susana
Patricio Borghetti as himself

Reception
Reviews for A la mala have been mixed. On review aggregator website Rotten Tomatoes, the film has a 43% approval rating based on 7 reviews, with an average rating of 5.8/10 and the consensus that it is "a masterfully subtle and poignant exploration of morality." Audiences surveyed by CinemaScore gave the film an average grade of "A" on an A+ to F scale.

The News Tribune said: "A la Mala begins with promise and finishes well enough to justify the investment in time. It's all that dull, formulaic stuff mediados pelicula (mid movie) that sucks the salt right off the tequila glass and leaves this one too stale to swallow."

References

External links

2015 romantic comedy films
Mexican romantic comedy films
2010s Spanish-language films
2010s English-language films
Films set in Mexico
Films shot in Mexico
Mexican independent films
Lionsgate films
2015 independent films
2015 multilingual films
Mexican multilingual films
2010s Mexican films
English-language Mexican films